Kauri Kõiv (born July 25, 1983, Elva) is a former Estonian biathlete. At the 2010 Winter Olympics in Vancouver, he finished 14th in the 4×7.5 km relay, 44th in the 20 km individual, 48th in the 10 km sprint and 50th in the 12.5 km pursuit. He represented  He represented Estonia at the 2014 Winter Olympics and 2018 Winter Olympics.

References

1983 births
Living people
Estonian male biathletes
Biathletes at the 2010 Winter Olympics
Biathletes at the 2014 Winter Olympics
Biathletes at the 2018 Winter Olympics
Olympic biathletes of Estonia
People from Elva, Estonia